Liyana may refer to:

 Liyana (film), a 2017 Swazi documentary film
Liyana Jasmay, a Malaysian actress
Liyana Fizi, a Malaysian musician
 Liyana, a Zimbabwean band fronted by Prudence Mabhena